Between 1492 and 1504, Italian explorer Christopher Columbus led four Spanish transatlantic maritime expeditions of discovery to the Americas. These voyages led to the widespread knowledge of the New World. This breakthrough inaugurated the period known as the Age of Discovery, which saw the colonization of the Americas, a related biological exchange, and trans-Atlantic trade. These events, the effects and consequences of which persist to the present, are often cited as the beginning of the modern era.

Born in the Republic of Genoa, Columbus was a navigator who sailed for the Crown of Castile (a predecessor to the modern Kingdom of Spain) in search of a westward route to the Indies, thought to be the East Asian source of spices and other precious oriental goods obtainable only through arduous overland routes. Columbus was partly inspired by 13th-century Italian explorer Marco Polo in his ambition to explore Asia and never admitted his failure in this, incessantly claiming and pointing to supposed evidence that he had reached the East Indies. Ever since, the Bahamas as well as the islands of the Caribbean have been referred to as the West Indies.

At the time of Columbus's voyages, the Americas were inhabited by Indigenous Americans. Soon after first contact, Eurasian diseases such as smallpox began to devastate the indigenous populations. Columbus participated in the beginning of the Spanish conquest of the Americas, which involved brutally treating and enslaving the natives in the range of thousands.

Columbus died in 1506, and the next year, the New World was named "America" after Amerigo Vespucci, who realized that it was a unique landmass. The search for a westward route to Asia was completed in 1521, when another Spanish voyage, the Magellan-Elcano expedition sailed across the Pacific Ocean and reached Southeast Asia, before returning to Europe and completing the first circumnavigation of the world.

Background

Many Europeans of Columbus's day assumed that a single, uninterrupted ocean surrounded Europe, Asia and Africa, although Norse explorers had colonized areas of North America beginning with Greenland . The Norse maintained a presence in North America for hundreds of years, but contacts between their North American settlements and Europe had all but ceased by the early 15th century.

Until the mid-15th century, Europe enjoyed a safe land passage to China and India—sources of valued goods such as silk, spices, and opiates—under the hegemony of the Mongol Empire (the Pax Mongolica, or Mongol Peace). With the Fall of Constantinople to the Turkish Ottoman Empire in 1453, the land route to Asia (the Silk Road) became more difficult as Christian traders were prohibited.

Portugal was the main European power interested in pursuing trade routes overseas, with the neighboring kingdom of Castile—predecessor to Spain—having been somewhat slower to begin exploring the Atlantic because of the land area it had to reconquer from the Moors during the Reconquista. This remained unchanged until the late 15th century, following the dynastic union by marriage of Queen Isabella I of Castile and King Ferdinand II of Aragon (together known as the Catholic Monarchs of Spain) in 1469, and the completion of the Reconquista in 1492, when the joint rulers conquered the Moorish kingdom of Granada, which had been providing Castile with African goods through tribute. The fledgling Spanish Empire decided to fund Columbus's expedition in hopes of finding new trade routes and circumventing the lock Portugal had secured on Africa and the Indian Ocean with the 1481 papal bull Aeterni regis.

Navigation plans
In response to the need for a new route to Asia, by the 1480s, Christopher and his brother Bartholomew had developed a plan to travel to the Indies (then construed roughly as all of southern and eastern Asia) by sailing directly west across what was believed to be the singular "Ocean Sea," the Atlantic Ocean. By about 1481, Florentine cosmographer Paolo dal Pozzo Toscanelli sent Columbus a map depicting such a route, with no intermediary landmass other than the mythical island of Antillia. In 1484 on the island of La Gomera in the Canaries, then undergoing conquest by Castile, Columbus heard from some inhabitants of El Hierro that there was supposed to be a group of islands to the west.

A popular misconception that Columbus had difficulty obtaining support for his plan because Europeans thought the Earth was flat can be traced back to a 17th-century campaign of Protestants against Catholicism, and was popularized in works such as Washington Irving's 1828 biography of Columbus. In fact, the knowledge that the Earth is spherical was widespread, having been the general opinion of Ancient Greek science, and gaining support throughout the Middle Ages (for example, Bede mentions it in The Reckoning of Time). The primitive maritime navigation of Columbus's time relied on both the stars and the curvature of the Earth.

Diameter of Earth and travel distance estimates

Eratosthenes had measured the diameter of the Earth with good precision in the 2nd century BC, and the means of calculating its diameter using an astrolabe was known to both scholars and navigators. Where Columbus differed from the generally accepted view of his time was in his incorrect assumption of a significantly smaller diameter for the Earth, claiming that Asia could be easily reached by sailing west across the Atlantic. Most scholars accepted Ptolemy's correct assessment that the terrestrial landmass (for Europeans of the time, comprising Eurasia and Africa) occupied 180 degrees of the terrestrial sphere, and dismissed Columbus's claim that the Earth was much smaller, and that Asia was only a few thousand nautical miles to the west of Europe.

Columbus believed the incorrect calculations of Marinus of Tyre, putting the landmass at 225 degrees, leaving only 135 degrees of water. Moreover, Columbus underestimated Alfraganus's calculation of the length of a degree, reading the Arabic astronomer's writings as if, rather than using the Arabic mile (about 1,830 m), he had used the Italian mile (about 1,480 meters). Alfraganus had calculated the length of a degree to be 56⅔ Arabic miles (66.2 nautical miles). Columbus therefore estimated the size of the Earth to be about 75% of Eratosthenes's calculation, and the distance from the Canary Islands to Japan as 2,400 nautical miles (about 23% of the real figure).

Trade winds
There was a further element of key importance in the voyages of Columbus, the trade winds. He planned to first sail to the Canary Islands before continuing west by utilizing the northeast trade wind. Part of the return to Spain would require traveling against the wind using an arduous sailing technique called beating, during which almost no progress can be made. To effectively make the return voyage, Columbus would need to follow the curving trade winds northeastward to the middle latitudes of the North Atlantic, where he would be able to catch the "westerlies" that blow eastward to the coast of Western Europe.

The navigational technique for travel in the Atlantic appears to have been exploited first by the Portuguese, who referred to it as the volta do mar ('turn of the sea'). Columbus's knowledge of the Atlantic wind patterns was, however, imperfect at the time of his first voyage. By sailing directly due west from the Canary Islands during hurricane season, skirting the so-called horse latitudes of the mid-Atlantic, Columbus risked either being becalmed or running into a tropical cyclone, both of which, by chance, he avoided.

Funding campaign
Around 1484, King John II of Portugal submitted Columbus's proposal to his experts, who rejected it on the basis that Columbus's estimation of a travel distance of 2,400 nautical miles was about four times too low (which was accurate).

In 1486, Columbus was granted an audience with the Catholic Monarchs, and he presented his plans to Isabella. She referred these to a committee, which determined that Columbus had grossly underestimated the distance to Asia. Pronouncing the idea impractical, they advised the monarchs not to support the proposed venture. To keep Columbus from taking his ideas elsewhere, and perhaps to keep their options open, the Catholic Monarchs gave him an allowance, totaling about 14,000 maravedís for the year, or about the annual salary of a sailor.

In 1488 Columbus again appealed to the court of Portugal, receiving a new invitation for an audience with John II. This again proved unsuccessful, in part because not long afterwards Bartolomeu Dias returned to Portugal following a successful rounding of the southern tip of Africa. With an eastern sea route now under its control, Portugal was no longer interested in trailblazing a western trade route to Asia crossing unknown seas.

In May 1489, Isabella sent Columbus another 10,000 maravedis, and the same year the Catholic Monarchs furnished him with a letter ordering all cities and towns under their domain to provide him food and lodging at no cost.

As Queen Isabella's forces neared victory over the Moorish Emirate of Granada for Castile, Columbus was summoned to the Spanish court for renewed discussions. He waited at King Ferdinand's camp until January 1492, when the monarchs conquered Granada. A council led by Isabella's confessor, Hernando de Talavera, found Columbus's proposal to reach the Indies implausible. Columbus had left for France when Ferdinand intervened, first sending Talavera and Bishop Diego Deza to appeal to the queen. Isabella was finally convinced by the king's clerk Luis de Santángel, who argued that Columbus would bring his ideas elsewhere, and offered to help arrange the funding. Isabella then sent a royal guard to fetch Columbus, who had travelled several kilometers toward Córdoba.

In the April 1492 "Capitulations of Santa Fe", Columbus was promised he would be given the title "Admiral of the Ocean Sea" and appointed viceroy and governor of the newly claimed and colonized for the Crown; he would also receive ten percent of all the revenues from the new lands in perpetuity if he was successful. He had the right to nominate three people, from whom the sovereigns would choose one, for any office in the new lands. The terms were unusually generous but, as his son later wrote, the monarchs were not confident of his return.

History

First voyage (1492–1493) 

For his westward voyage to find a shorter route to the Orient, Columbus and his crew took three medium-sized ships, the largest of which was a carrack (Spanish: nao), the Santa María, which was owned and captained by Juan de la Cosa, and under Columbus's direct command. The other two were smaller caravels; the name of one is lost, but it is known by the Castilian nickname Pinta ("painted one"). The other, the Santa Clara, was nicknamed the Niña ("girl"), perhaps in reference to her owner, Juan Niño of Moguer. The Pinta and the Niña were piloted by the Pinzón brothers (Martín Alonso and Vicente Yáñez, respectively). On the morning of 3 August 1492, Columbus departed from Palos de la Frontera, going down the Rio Tinto and into the Atlantic.

Three days into the journey, on 6 August 1492, the rudder of the Pinta broke. Martín Alonso Pinzón suspected the owners of the ship of sabotage, as they were afraid to go on the journey. The crew was able to secure the rudder with ropes until they could reach the Canary Islands, where they arrived on 9 August. The Pinta had its rudder replaced on the island of Gran Canaria, and by September 2 the ships rendezvoused at La Gomera, where the Niñas lateen sails were re-rigged to standard square sails. Final provisions were secured, and on 6 September the ships departed San Sebastián de La Gomera for what turned out to be a five-week-long westward voyage across the Atlantic.

As described in the abstract of his journal made by Bartolomé de las Casas, on the outward bound voyage Columbus recorded two sets of distances: one was in measurements he normally used, the other in the Portuguese maritime leagues used by his crew. Las Casas originally interpreted that he reported the shorter distances to his crew so they would not worry about sailing too far from Spain, but Oliver Dunn and James Kelley state that this was a misunderstanding.

On 13 September 1492, Columbus observed that the needle of his compass no longer pointed to the North Star. It was once believed that Columbus had discovered magnetic declination, but it was later shown that the phenomenon was already known, both in Europe and in China.

First landing in the Americas

After 29 days out of sight of land, on 7 October 1492, the crew spotted "[i]mmense flocks of birds", some of which his sailors trapped and determined to be "field" birds (probably Eskimo curlews and American golden plovers). Columbus changed course to follow their flight.

On 11 October, Columbus changed the fleet's course to due west, and sailed through the night, believing land was soon to be found. At around 10:00 in the evening, Columbus thought he saw a light "like a little wax candle rising and falling". Four hours later, land was sighted by a sailor named Rodrigo de Triana (also known as Juan Rodríguez Bermejo) aboard the Pinta. Triana immediately alerted the rest of the crew with a shout, and the ship's captain, Martín Alonso Pinzón, verified the land sighting and alerted Columbus by firing a lombard. Columbus would later assert that he had first seen land, thus earning the promised annual reward of 10,000 maravedís.

Columbus called this island San Salvador, in the present-day Bahamas; the indigenous name was Guanahani. According to Samuel Eliot Morison, San Salvador Island is the only island fitting the position indicated by Columbus's journal. Columbus wrote of the natives he first encountered in his journal entry of 12 October 1492:Many of the men I have seen have scars on their bodies, and when I made signs to them to find out how this happened, they indicated that people from other nearby islands come to San Salvador to capture them; they defend themselves the best they can. I believe that people from the mainland come here to take them as slaves. They ought to make good and skilled servants, for they repeat very quickly whatever we say to them. I think they can very easily be made Christians, for they seem to have no religion. If it pleases our Lord, I will take six of them to Your Highnesses when I depart, in order that they may learn our language.

Columbus called the indigenous Americans  in the mistaken belief that he had reached the East Indies; the islands of the Caribbean are termed the West Indies because of this error.

Columbus initially encountered the Lucayan, Taíno, and Arawak peoples. Noting their gold ear ornaments, Columbus took some of the Arawaks prisoner and insisted that they guide him to the source of the gold. Columbus noted that their primitive weapons and military tactics made the natives susceptible to easy conquest.

Columbus observed the people and their cultural lifestyle. He also explored the northeast coast of Cuba, landing on 28 October 1492, and the north-western coast of Hispaniola, present day Haiti, by 5 December 1492. Here, the Santa Maria ran aground on Christmas Day, 25 December 1492, and had to be abandoned. Columbus was received by the native cacique (chieftain) Guacanagari, who gave him permission to leave some of his men behind. Columbus left 39 men, including the interpreter Luis de Torres, and founded the settlement of La Navidad. He kept sailing along the northern coast of Hispaniola with a single ship, until he encountered Pinzón and the Pinta on 6 January.

On 13 January 1493, Columbus made his last stop of this voyage in the Americas, in the Bay of Rincón at the eastern end of the Samaná Peninsula in northeast Hispaniola. There he encountered the Ciguayos, the only natives who offered violent resistance during this first voyage. The Ciguayos refused to trade the amount of bows and arrows that Columbus desired; in the ensuing clash one Ciguayo was stabbed in the buttocks and another wounded with an arrow in his chest. Because of the Ciguayos' use of arrows, Columbus named the inlet the Bay of Arrows (or Gulf of Arrows).

Four natives who boarded the Niña at Samaná Peninsula told Columbus of what was possibly the Isla de Carib (probably Puerto Rico), which was supposed to be populated by cannibalistic Caribs, as well as Matinino, an island populated only by women, which Columbus associated with an island in the Indian Ocean described by Marco Polo.

First return 

On 16 January 1493, the homeward journey was begun.

While returning to Spain, the Niña and Pinta encountered the roughest storm of their journey, and on the night of 13 February, lost contact with each other. All hands on the Niña vowed, if they were spared, to make a pilgrimage to the nearest church of Our Lady wherever they first made land.

On the morning of 15 February, land was spotted. Columbus believed they were approaching the Portuguese Azores Islands, but others felt that they were considerably north of the islands. Columbus turned out to be right. On the night of 17 February, the Niña laid anchor at Santa Maria Island, but the cable broke on sharp rocks, forcing Columbus to stay offshore until morning, when a safer location was found nearby. A few sailors took a boat to the island, where they were told by several islanders of a still safer place to land, so the Niña moved once again. At this spot, Columbus took aboard several islanders with food. When told of the vow to Our Lady, the islanders directed the crew to a small shrine nearby.

Columbus sent half of the crew to the island to fulfill their vow, but he and the rest stayed on the Niña, planning to send the other half later. While the shore party were in prayer, they were taken prisoner by order of the island's captain, João de Castanheira, ostensibly out of fear that they were pirates. Castanheira commandeered their shore boat, which he took with several armed men to the Niña, planning to arrest Columbus. When Columbus defied him, Castanheira said he did not believe or care about Columbus' story, denounced Spaniards, and went back to the island. After another two days, Castanheira released the prisoners, having been unable to get confessions from them or to capture his real target, Columbus. Some claimed that Columbus was captured, but this is contradicted by Columbus's log book.

Leaving the island of Santa Maria in the Azores on 23 February, Columbus headed for Castilian Spain, but another storm forced him into Lisbon. He anchored next to a king's harbor patrol ship on 4 March 1493, where he was told a fleet of 100 caravels had been lost in the storm. Astoundingly, both the Niña and the Pinta had been spared. Not finding King John II of Portugal in Lisbon, Columbus wrote to him and waited for a reply. The king agreed to meet Columbus at Vale do Paraíso, despite the poor relations between Portugal and Castile at the time. Upon learning of Columbus's discoveries, the Portuguese king informed him that he believed the voyage to be in violation of the 1479 Treaty of Alcáçovas.

After spending more than a week in Portugal, Columbus set sail for Spain. He arrived back in Palos on 15 March 1493 and later met with Ferdinand and Isabella in Barcelona  to report his findings.

Columbus showed off what he had brought back from his voyage to the monarchs, including a few small samples of gold, pearls, gold jewelry from the natives, a few Taíno he had kidnapped, flowers, and a hammock. He also brought the previously unknown tobacco plant, the pineapple fruit, and the turkey. He did not bring any of the precious East Indies spices such as black pepper, ginger or cloves. In his log, he wrote "there is also plenty of 'ají', which is their pepper, which is more valuable than black pepper, and all the people eat nothing else, it being very wholesome".

Columbus brought captured Taínos to present to the sovereigns, never having met the infamous Caribs. In Columbus's letter on the first voyage, addressed to the Spanish court, he insisted he had reached Asia, describing the island of Hispaniola as being off the coast of China. He emphasized the potential riches of the land, exaggerating the abundance of gold, and that the natives seemed ready to convert to Christianity. The letter was translated into multiple languages and widely distributed, creating a sensation:
Hispaniola is a miracle. Mountains and hills, plains and pastures, are both fertile and beautiful ... the harbors are unbelievably good and there are many wide rivers of which the majority contain gold. ... There are many spices, and great mines of gold and other metals...

Upon Columbus's return, most people initially accepted that he had reached the East Indies, including the sovereigns and Pope Alexander VI, though in a letter to the Vatican dated 1 November 1493, the historian Peter Martyr described Columbus as the discoverer of a Novi Orbis ("New Globe"). The pope issued four bulls (the first three of which are collectively known as the Bulls of Donation), to determine how Spain and Portugal would colonize and divide the spoils of the new lands. Inter caetera, issued 4 May 1493, divided the world outside Europe between Spain and Portugal along a north–south meridian 100 leagues west of either the Azores or Cape Verde Islands in the mid-Atlantic, thus granting Spain all the land discovered by Columbus. The 1494 Treaty of Tordesillas, ratified in the next decade by Pope Julius II, moved the dividing line to 370 leagues west of the Azores or Cape Verde.

Second voyage (1493–1496) 

The stated purpose of the second voyage was to convert the indigenous Americans to Christianity. Before Columbus left Spain, he was directed by Ferdinand and Isabella to maintain friendly, even loving, relations with the natives. He set sail from Cádiz, Spain, on 25 September 1493.

The fleet for the second voyage was much larger: two naos and 15 caravels. The two naos were the flagship Marigalante ("Gallant Mary") and the Gallega; the caravels were the Fraila ('the nun'), San Juan, Colina ('the hill'), Gallarda ('the gallant'), Gutierre, Bonial, Rodriga, Triana, Vieja ('the old'), Prieta ('the brown'), Gorda ('the fat'), Cardera, and Quintera. The Niña returned for this expedition, which also included a ship named Pinta probably identical to that from the first expedition. In addition, the expedition saw the construction of the first ship in the Americas, the Santa Cruz or India.

Caribbean exploration
On 3 November 1493, Christopher Columbus landed on a rugged shore on an island that he named Dominica. On the same day, he landed at Marie-Galante, which he named Santa María la Galante. After sailing past Les Saintes (Todos los Santos), he arrived at Guadeloupe (Santa María de Guadalupe), which he explored between 4 November and 10 November 1493. The exact course of his voyage through the Lesser Antilles is debated, but it seems likely that he turned north, sighting and naming many islands including Santa María de Montserrat (Montserrat), Santa María la Antigua (Antigua), Santa María la Redonda (Saint Martin), and Santa Cruz (Saint Croix, on 14 November). He also sighted and named the island chain of the Santa Úrsula y las Once Mil Vírgenes (the Virgin Islands), and named the islands of Virgen Gorda.

On Santa Cruz, the Europeans saw a canoe with a few Carib men and two women. They had two male captives, and had recently castrated them. The Europeans pursued them, and were met with arrows from both the men and women, fatally wounding at least one man, who perished about a week later. The Europeans either killed or captured all aboard the canoe, thereafter beheading them. Another was thrown overboard, and when he was spotted crawling away holding his entrails, the Arawaks recommended he be recaptured so he would not alert his tribe; he was thrown overboard again, and then had to be shot down with arrows. Columbus's childhood friend Michele da Cuneo—according to his own account—took one of the women in the skirmish, whom Columbus let him keep as a slave; Cuneo subsequently beat and raped her.

The fleet continued to the Greater Antilles, and landed on the island of San Juan Bautista, present-day Puerto Rico, on 19 November 1493. Diego Álvarez Chanca recounts that on this island, the Europeans rescued some women from a group of at least 20 that the local Caribs had been keeping as sex slaves. The women explained that any male captives were eaten, and that their own male offspring were castrated and made to serve the Caribs until they were old enough to be considered good to eat. The Europeans rescued three of these boys.

Hispaniola and Jamaica
On 22 November, Columbus sailed from San Juan Bautista to Hispaniola. The next morning, a native taken during the first voyage was returned to Samaná Bay. The fleet sailed about 170 miles over two days and discovered, at Monte Cristi, decomposing bodies of four men; one had a beard implying he had been a Spaniard. On the night of 27 November, cannons and flares were ignited in an attempt to signal La Navidad, but there was no response. A canoe party led by a cousin of Guacanagari presented Columbus with two golden masks and told him that Guacanagari had been injured by another chief, Caonabo, and that except for some Spanish casualties resulting from sickness and quarrel, the rest of his men were well. The next day, the Spanish fleet discovered the burnt remains of the Navidad fortress, and Guacanagari's cousin admitted that the Europeans had been wiped out by Caonabo. Other natives showed the Spaniards some of the bodies, and said that they had "taken three or four women apiece". While some suspicion was placed on Guacanagari, it gradually emerged that two of the Spaniards had formed a murderous gang in search of gold and women, prompting Caonabo's wrath. The fleet then fought the winds, traveling only 32 miles over 25 days, and arriving at a plain on the north coast of Hispaniola on 2 January 1494. There, they established the settlement of La Isabela. Columbus spent some time exploring the interior of the island for gold. Finding some, he established a small fort in the interior.

Columbus left Hispaniola on 24 April 1494, and arrived at the island of Cuba (which he had named Juana during his first voyage) on 30 April and Discovery Bay, Jamaica, on 5 May. He explored the south coast of Cuba, which he believed to be a peninsula of China rather than an island, and several nearby islands including La Evangelista (the Isle of Youth), before returning to Hispaniola on 20 August.

Slavery, settlers, and tribute

Columbus had planned for Queen Isabella to set up trading posts with the cities of the Far East made famous by Marco Polo, but whose Silk Road and eastern maritime routes had been blockaded to her crown's trade. However, Columbus would never find Cathay (China) or Zipangu (Japan), and there was no longer any Great Khan for trade treaties.

In 1494, Columbus sent Alonso de Ojeda (whom a contemporary described as "always the first to draw blood wherever there was a war or quarrel") to Cibao (where gold was being mined), which resulted in Ojeda's capturing several natives on an accusation of theft. Ojeda cut the ears off of one native, and sent the others to La Isabela in chains, where Columbus ordered them to be decapitated. During his brief reign, Columbus executed Spanish colonists for minor crimes, and used dismemberment as another form of punishment. By the end of 1494, disease and famine had claimed two-thirds of the Spanish settlers. A native Nahuatl account depicts the social breakdown that accompanied the pandemic: "A great many died from this plague, and many others died of hunger. They could not get up to search for food, and everyone else was too sick to care for them, so they starved to death in their beds."

By 1494, Columbus had shared his viceroyship with one of his military officers named Margarit, ordering him to prioritize Christianizing the natives, but that part of their noses and ears should be cut off for stealing. Margarit's men exploited the natives by beating, raping and enslaving them, with none on Hispaniola being baptized for another two years. Columbus's brother Diego warned Margarit to follow the admiral's orders, which provoked him to take three caravels back to Spain. Fray Buil, who was supposed to perform baptisms, accompanied Margarit. After arriving in Spain in late 1494, Buil complained to the Spanish court of the Columbus brothers and that there was no gold. Groups of Margarit's soldiers who remained in the west continued brutalizing the natives. Instead of forbidding this, Columbus participated in enslaving the indigenous people. In February 1495, he took over 1,500 Arawaks, some of whom had rebelled against the oppression of the colonists, and many of whom were subsequently released or taken by the Caribs. That month, Columbus shipped approximately 500 of these Americans to Spain to be sold as slaves; about 40% died en route, and half of the rest were sick upon arrival. In June of that year, the Spanish crown sent ships and supplies to the colony on Hispaniola, which Florentine merchant Gianotto Berardi had helped procure. In October, Berardi received almost 40,000 maravedís worth of slaves, who were alleged to be either cannibals or prisoners.

Columbus's tribute system was described by his son Ferdinand: "In the Cibao, where the gold mines were, every person of fourteen years of age or upward was to pay a large hawk's bell of gold dust; all others were each to pay 25 pounds of cotton. Whenever an Indian delivered his tribute, he was to receive a brass or copper token which he must wear about his neck as proof that he had made his payment; any Indian found without such a token was to be punished." The monarchs, who suggested the tokens, called for a light punishment, but any Indian found without a copper token had their hands cut off, which was a likely death sentence. Since there was no abundance of gold on the island, the natives had no chance of meeting Columbus's quota and thousands are reported to have committed suicide. By 1497, the tribute system had all but collapsed.

Columbus became ill in 1495, and during this time, his troops acted out of order, enacting cruelties on the natives, including torturing them to learn where the supposed gold was. When he recovered, he led men and dogs to hunt down natives who fled their forced duties, killing them or cutting off their hands as a warning to others. Brutalities and murders were carried out even against natives who were sick and unarmed. In addition, Spanish colonists under Columbus's rule began to buy and sell natives as slaves, including children.

The Spanish fleet departed La Isabela on 10 March 1496. Again set back by unfavorable trade winds, supplies began to run low; on 10 April, Columbus requested food from the natives of Guadeloupe. Upon going ashore, the Spaniards were ambushed by arrows; in response, they destroyed some huts. They then held a group of 13 native women and children hostage to force a sale of cassava. The Niña and India left Guadeloupe on 20 April. On 8 June, the fleeted landed at Portugal, near Odemira, and returned to Spain via the Bay of Cádiz on 11 June.

Third voyage (1498–1500) 

According to the abstract of Columbus's journal made by Bartolomé de Las Casas, the objective of the third voyage was to verify the existence of a continent that King John II of Portugal suggested was located to the southwest of the Cape Verde Islands. King John reportedly knew of the existence of such a mainland because "canoes had been found which set out from the coast of Guinea [West Africa] and sailed to the west with merchandise." Italian explorer John Cabot probably reached the mainland of the American continent in June 1497, although his landing site is disputed.

On 30 May 1498, Columbus left with six ships from Sanlúcar, Spain, for his third trip to the Americas. Three of the ships headed directly for Hispaniola with much-needed supplies, while Columbus took the other three in an exploration of what might lie to the south of the Caribbean islands he had already visited, including a hoped-for passage to continental Asia. Columbus led his fleet to the Portuguese island of Porto Santo, his wife's native land. He then sailed to Madeira and spent some time there with the Portuguese captain João Gonçalves da Camara, before sailing to the Canary Islands and Cape Verde.

On 13 July, Columbus's fleet entered the doldrums of the mid-Atlantic, where they were becalmed for several days, the heat doing damage to their ships, food, and water supply. An easterly wind finally propelled them westwards, which was maintained until 22 July, when birds flying from southwest to northeast were sighted, and the fleet turned north in the direction of Dominica. The men sighted the land of Trinidad on 31 July, approaching from the southeast. The fleet sailed along the southern coast and entered Dragon's Mouth, anchoring near Soldado Rock (west of Icacos Point, Trinidad's southwesternmost point) where they made contact with a group of Amerindians in canoes. On 1 August, Columbus and his men arrived at a landmass near the mouth of South America's Orinoco river, in the region of modern-day Venezuela. Columbus recognized from the topography that it must be the continent's mainland, but while describing it as an otro mundo ('other world'), retained the belief that it was Asia—and perhaps an Earthly Paradise. On 2 August, they landed at Icacos Point (which Columbus named Punta de Arenal) in modern Trinidad, narrowly avoiding a violent encounter with the natives. Early on 4 August, a tsunami nearly capsized Columbus's ship. The men sailed across the Gulf of Paria, and on 5 August, landed on the mainland of South America at the Paria Peninsula. Columbus, suffering from a monthlong bout of insomnia and impaired vision from his bloodshot eyes, authorized the other fleet captains to go ashore first: one planted a cross, and the other recorded that Columbus subsequently landed to formally take the province for Spain. They sailed further west, where the sight of pearls compelled Columbus to send men to obtain some, if not gold. The natives provided nourishment including a maize wine, new to Columbus. Compelled to reach Hispaniola before the food aboard his ship spoiled, Columbus was disappointed to discover that they had sailed into a gulf, and while they had obtained fresh water, they had to go back east to reach open waters again.

Making observations with a quadrant at sea, Columbus inaccurately measured the polar radius of the North Star's diurnal motion to be five degrees, double the value of another erroneous reading he had made from further north. This led him to describe the figure of the Earth as pear-shaped, with the "stalk" portion ascending towards Heaven. (In fact, the Earth ever so slightly is pear-shaped, with its "stalk" pointing north.) He then sailed to the islands of Chacachacare and Margarita (reaching the latter on 14 August), and sighted Tobago (which he named Bella Forma) and Grenada (which he named Concepción).

In poor health, Columbus returned to Hispaniola on 19 August, only to find that many of the Spanish settlers of the new colony were in rebellion against his rule, claiming that Columbus had misled them about the supposedly bountiful riches they expected to find. A number of returning settlers and sailors lobbied against Columbus at the Spanish court, accusing him and his brothers of gross mismanagement. Columbus had some of his crew hanged for disobedience. He had an economic interest in the enslavement of the Hispaniola natives and for that reason was not eager to baptize them, which attracted criticism from some churchmen. An entry in his journal from September 1498 reads: "From here one might send, in the name of the Holy Trinity, as many slaves as could be sold ..."

Columbus was eventually forced to make peace with the rebellious colonists on humiliating terms. In 1500, the Crown had him removed as governor, arrested, and transported in chains to Spain. He was eventually freed and allowed to return to the Americas, but not as governor. As an added insult, in 1499, the Portuguese explorer Vasco da Gama returned from his first voyage to India, having sailed east around the southern tip of Africa—unlocking a sea route to Asia.

Governorship

Colonist rebellions
After his second journey, Columbus had requested that 330 people be sent to stay permanently (though voluntarily) on Hispaniola, all on the king's pay. Specifically, he asked for 100 men to work as wood men soldiers and laborers, 50 farmers, 40 squires, 30 sailors, 30 cabin boys, 20 goldsmiths, 10 gardeners, 20 handymen, and 30 women. In addition to this, plans were made to maintain friars and clergymen, a physician, a pharmacist, an herbalist, and musicians for entertaining the colonists. Fearing that the king was going to restrict money allotted for wages, Columbus suggested that Spanish criminals be pardoned in exchange for a few years unpaid service in Hispaniola, and the king agreed to this. A pardon for the death penalty would require two years of service, and one year of service was required for lesser crimes. They also instructed that those who had been sentenced to exile would also be redirected to be exiled in Hispaniola.

These new colonists were sent directly to Hispaniola in three ships with supplies, while Columbus was taking an alternate route with the other three ships to explore. As these new Colonists arrived on Hispaniola, a rebellion was brewing under Francisco Roldán (a man Columbus had left as chief mayor, under his brothers Diego and Bartolomew). By the time Columbus arrived on Hispaniola, Roldán held the territory of Xaraguá, and some of the new colonists had joined his rebellion. Over months, Columbus tried negotiating with the rebels. At his behest, Roldán tried the other rebels, ordering his former partner, Adrián de Mújica, to be hanged.

Columbus was physically and mentally exhausted; his body was wracked by arthritis and his eyes by ophthalmia. In October 1499, he sent two ships to Spain, asking the Court of Castile to appoint a royal commissioner to help him govern. On 3 February 1500, he returned to Santo Domingo with plans to sail back to Spain to defend himself from the accounts of the rebels.

Bobadilla's inquiry

The sovereigns gave Francisco de Bobadilla, a member of the Order of Calatrava, complete control as governor in the Americas. Bobadilla arrived in Santo Domingo in August 1500, where Diego was overseeing the execution of rebels, while Columbus was suppressing a revolt at Grenada. Bobadilla immediately received many serious complaints about all three Columbus brothers, including that "seven Spanish men had been hanged that week," with another five awaiting execution. Bobadilla had orders to find out "which persons were the ones who rose up against the admiral and our justice and for what cause and reason, and what ... damage they have done," then "detain those whom you find guilty ... and confiscate their goods." The crown's command regarding Columbus dictated that the admiral must relinquish all control of the colonies, keeping only his personal wealth.

Bobadilla used force to prevent the execution of several prisoners, and subsequently took charge of Columbus's possessions, including papers that he would have used to defend himself in Spain. Bobadilla suspended the tribute system for a twenty-year period, then summoned the admiral. In early October 1500, Columbus and Diego presented themselves to Bobadilla, and were put in chains aboard La Gorda, Columbus's own ship. Only the ship's cook was willing to put the shamed admiral in chains. Bobadilla took much of Columbus's gold and other treasures. Ferdinand Columbus recorded that the governor took "testimony from their open enemies, the rebels, and even showing open favor," and auctioned off some of his father's possessions "for one third of their value."

Bobadilla's inquiry produced testimony that Columbus forced priests not to baptize natives without his express permission, so he could first decide whether or not they should be sold into slavery. He allegedly captured a tribe of 300 under Roldán's protection to be sold into slavery, and informed other Christians that half of the indigenous servants should be yielded to him. Further, he allegedly ordered at least 12 Spaniards to be whipped and tied by the neck and feet for trading gold for something to eat without his permission. Other allegations include that he: ordered a woman to be whipped naked on the back of a donkey for lying that she was pregnant, had a woman's tongue cut out for seeming to insult him and his brothers, cut a Spaniard's throat for being homosexual, ordered Christians to be hanged for stealing bread, ordered a cabin boy's hand cut off and posted publicly for using a trap to catch a fish, and ordered for a man to have his nose and ears cut off, as well as to be whipped, shackled, and banished. Multiple culprits were given a potentially fatal 100 lashes, sometimes while naked. Some fifty men starved to death on La Isabela because of tight control over the ship's rations, despite there being an abundance.

Trial in Spain

A number of returned settlers and friars lobbied against Columbus at the Spanish court, accusing him of mismanagement. By his own request, Columbus remained in chains during the entire voyage home. Once in Cádiz, a grieving Columbus wrote to a friend at court:

It is now seventeen years since I came to serve these princes with the Enterprise of the Indies. They made me pass eight of them in discussion, and at the end rejected it as a thing of jest. Nevertheless I persisted therein... Over there I have placed under their sovereignty more land than there is in Africa and Europe, and more than 1,700 islands... In seven years I, by the divine will, made that conquest. At a time when I was entitled to expect rewards and retirement, I was incontinently arrested and sent home loaded with chains... The accusation was brought out of malice on the basis of charges made by civilians who had revolted and wished to take possession on the land...

I beg your graces, with the zeal of faithful Christians in whom their Highnesses have confidence, to read all my papers, and to consider how I, who came from so far to serve these princes... now at the end of my days have been despoiled of my honor and my property without cause, wherein is neither justice nor mercy.

Columbus and his brothers were jailed for six weeks before the busy King Ferdinand ordered them released. On 12 December 1500, the king and queen summoned the Columbus brothers to their presence at the Alhambra palace in Granada. With his chains at last removed, Columbus wore shortened sleeves so the marks on his skin would be visible. At the palace, the royal couple heard the brothers' pleas; Columbus was brought to tears as he admitted his faults and begged for forgiveness. Their freedom was restored. On 3 September 1501, the door was firmly shut on Columbus's role as governor. From that point forward, Nicolás de Ovando y Cáceres was to be the new governor of the Indies, although Columbus retained the titles of admiral and viceroy. A royal mandate dated 27 September ordered Bobadilla to return Columbus's possessions.

Fourth voyage (1502–1504) 

After much persuasion, the sovereigns agreed to fund Columbus's fourth voyage. It would be his final chance to prove himself and become the first man ever to circumnavigate the world. Columbus's goal was to find the Strait of Malacca to the Indian Ocean. On 14 March 1502, Columbus started his fourth voyage with 147 men and with strict orders from the king and queen not to stop at Hispaniola, but only to search for a westward passage to the Indian Ocean mainland. Before he left, Columbus wrote a letter to the Governors of the Bank of Saint George, Genoa, dated at Seville, 2 April 1502. He wrote "Although my body is here my heart is always near you." Accompanied by his stepbrother Bartolomeo, Diego Mendez, and his 13-year-old son Ferdinand, he left Cádiz on 9 May 1502, with his flagship, Capitana, as well as the Gallega, Vizcaína, and Santiago de Palos. They first sailed to Arzila on the Moroccan coast to rescue the Portuguese soldiers who he heard were under siege by the Moors.

After using the trade winds to cross the Atlantic in a brisk twenty days, on 15 June, they landed at Carbet on the island of Martinique (Martinica). Columbus anticipated that a hurricane was brewing and had a ship that needed to be replaced, so he headed to Hispaniola, despite being forbidden to land there. He arrived at Santo Domingo on June 29, but was denied port, and the new governor refused to listen to his warning of a storm. While Columbus's ships sheltered at the mouth of the Haina River, Governor Bobadilla departed, with Roldán and Columbus's gold aboard his ship, accompanied by a convoy of 30 other vessels. Columbus's personal gold and other belongings were put on the fragile Aguya, considered the fleet's least seaworthy vessel. The onset of a hurricane drove some ships ashore, with some sinking in the harbor of Santo Domingo; Bobadilla's ship is thought to have reached the eastern end of Hispaniola before sinking. About 20 other vessels sank in the Atlantic, with a total of some 500 people drowning. Three damaged ships made it back to Santo Domingo; one of these had Juan de la Cosa and Rodrigo de Bastidas on board. Only the Aguya made it to Spain, causing some of Columbus's enemies to accuse him of conjuring the storm.

After the hurricane, Columbus regrouped with his men, and after a brief stop at Jamaica and off the coast of Cuba to replenish, he sailed to modern Central America, arriving at Guanaja (Isla de los Pinos) in the Bay Islands off the coast of Honduras on 30 July 1502. Here Bartolomeo found native merchants—possibly (but not conclusively) Mayans—and a large canoe, which was described as "long as a galley" and was filled with cargo. The natives introduced Columbus and his entourage to cacao. Columbus spoke with an elder, and thought he described having seen people with swords and horses (possibly the Spaniards), and that they were "only ten days' journey to the river Ganges". On 14 August, Columbus landed on the mainland of the Americas at Puerto Castilla, near Trujillo, Honduras. He spent two months exploring the coasts of Honduras, Nicaragua, and Costa Rica looking for the passage, before arriving in Almirante Bay, Panama, on 16 October.

In mid-November, Columbus was told by some of the natives that a province called Ciguare "lie just nine days' journey by land to the west", or some 200 miles from his location in Veragua. Here was supposed to be found "gold without limit", "people who wear coral on their heads" who "know of pepper", "do business in fairs and markets", and who were "accustomed to warfare". Columbus would later write to the sovereigns that, according to the natives, "the sea encompasses Ciguare and ... it is a journey of ten days to the Ganges River." This could suggest that Columbus knew he had found a unknown continent distinct from Asia.

On 5 December 1502, Columbus and his crew found themselves in a storm unlike any they had ever experienced. In his journal Columbus writes,For nine days I was as one lost, without hope of life. Eyes never beheld the sea so angry, so high, so covered with foam. The wind not only prevented our progress, but offered no opportunity to run behind any headland for shelter; hence we were forced to keep out in this bloody ocean, seething like a pot on a hot fire. Never did the sky look more terrible; for one whole day and night it blazed like a furnace, and the lightning broke with such violence that each time I wondered if it had carried off my spars and sails; the flashes came with such fury and frightfulness that we all thought that the ship would be blasted. All this time the water never ceased to fall from the sky; I do not say it rained, for it was like another deluge. The men were so worn out that they longed for death to end their dreadful suffering.

In Panamá, he learned from the Ngobe of gold and a strait to another ocean. After some exploration, he established a garrison at the mouth of Belén River in January 1503. By 6 April, the garrison he had established captured the local tribe leader El Quibían, who had demanded they not go down the Belén River. El Quibían escaped, and returned with an army to attack and repel the Spanish, damaging some of the ships so that one vessel had to be abandoned. Columbus left for Hispaniola on 16 April; on 10 May, he sighted the Cayman Islands, naming them Las Tortugas after the numerous sea turtles there. His ships next sustained more damage in a storm off the coast of Cuba. Unable to travel any farther, the ships were beached in St. Ann's Bay, Jamaica, on 25 June.

For a year Columbus and his men remained stranded on Jamaica. A Spaniard, Diego Mendez, and some natives paddled a canoe to get help from Hispaniola. The island's governor, Nicolás de Ovando y Cáceres, detested Columbus and obstructed all efforts to rescue him and his men. In the meantime, Columbus had to mesmerize the natives in order to prevent being attacked by them and gain their goodwill. He did so by correctly predicting a lunar eclipse for 29 February 1504, using the Ephemeris of the German astronomer Regiomontanus.

In May 1504 a battle took place between men loyal to Columbus and those loyal to the Porras brothers, in which there was a sword fight between Bartholomew Columbus and Francisco de Porras. Bartholomew won against Francisco but he spared his life. In this way, the mutiny ended. Help finally arrived from the governor Ovando, on 29 June, when a caravel sent by Diego Méndez finally appeared on the island. At this time there were 110 members of the expedition alive out of the 147 who sailed from Spain with Columbus. Due to the strong winds, it took the caravel 45 days to reach La Hispaniola. This was a trip that Diego Méndez had previously made in four days in a canoe.

About 38 of the 110 men who survived decided not to board again and stayed in Hispaniola instead of returning to Spain. On 11 September 1504, Christopher Columbus and his son Fernando embarked in a caravel to travel from Hispaniola to Spain, paying their corresponding tickets. They arrived in Sanlúcar de Barrameda on 7 November and from there they traveled to Seville.

Legacy

The news of Columbus's first voyage set off many other westward explorations by European states, which aimed to profit from trade and colonization. This would instigate a related biological exchange, and trans-Atlantic trade. These events, the effects and consequences of which persist to the present, are sometimes cited as the beginning of the modern era.

Upon first landing in the West, Columbus pondered enslaving the natives, and upon his return broadcast the perceived willingness of the natives to convert to Christianity. Columbus's second voyage saw the first major skirmish between Europeans and Native Americans for five centuries, when the Vikings had come to the Americas. One of the women was captured in the battle by a friend of Columbus, who let him keep her as a slave; this man subsequently beat and raped her. In 1503, the Spanish monarchs established the Indian reductions, settlements intended to relocate and exploit the natives.

With the Age of Discovery starting in the 15th century, Europeans explored the world by ocean, searching for particular trade goods, humans to enslave, and trading locations and ports. The most desired trading goods were gold, silver and spices. For the Catholic monarchies of Spain and Portugal, a division of influence of the land discovered by Columbus became necessary to avoid conflict. This was resolved by papal intervention in 1494 when the Treaty of Tordesillas purported to divide the world between the two powers. The Portuguese were to receive everything outside of Europe east of a line that ran 270 leagues west of the Cape Verde Islands. The Spanish received everything west of this line, territory that was still almost completely unknown, and proved to be primarily the vast majority of the continents of the Americas and the Islands of the Pacific Ocean. In 1500, the Portuguese navigator Pedro Álvares Cabral arrived at a point on the eastern coast of South America on the Portuguese side of the dividing line. This would lead to the Portuguese colonization of what is now Brazil.

In 1499, Italian explorer Amerigo Vespucci participated in a voyage to the western world with Columbus's associates Alonso de Ojeda and Juan de la Cosa. Columbus referred to the West Indies as the Indias Occidentales ('West Indies') in his 1502 Book of Privileges, calling them "unknown to all the world". He gathered information later that year from the natives of Central America which seem to further indicate that he realized he had found a new land. Vespucci, who had initially followed Columbus in the belief that he had reached Asia, suggested in a 1503 letter to Lorenzo di Pierfrancesco that he had known for two years that these lands composed a new continent. A letter to Piero Soderini, published c. 1505 and purportedly by Vespucci, claims that he first voyaged to the American mainland in 1497, a year before Columbus. In 1507, a year after Columbus's death, the New World was named "America" on a map by German cartographer Martin Waldseemüller. Waldseemüller retracted this naming in 1513, seemingly after Sebastian Cabot, Las Casas, and many historians convincingly argued that the Soderini letter had been a falsification. On his new map, Waldseemüller labelled the continent discovered by Columbus Terra Incognita ('unknown land').

On 25 September 1513, the Spanish conquistador Vasco Núñez de Balboa, exploring overland, became the first European to encounter the Pacific Ocean from the shores of the Americas, calling it the "South Sea". Later, on 29 October 1520, Magellan's circumnavigation expedition discovered the first maritime passage from the Atlantic to the Pacific, at the southern end of what is now Chile (Strait of Magellan), and his fleet ended up sailing around the whole Earth. Almost a century later, another, wider passage to the Pacific would be discovered farther to the south, bordering Cape Horn.

In the Americas the Spanish found a number of empires that were as large and populous as those in Europe. Small bodies of Spanish conquistadors, with large armies of indigenous groups, managed to conquer these states. The most notable amongst them were the Aztec Empire in modern Mexico (conquered in 1521) and the Inca Empire in modern Peru (conquered in 1532). During this time, pandemics of European diseases such as smallpox devastated the indigenous populations. Once Spanish sovereignty was established, the Spanish focused on the extraction and export of gold and silver.

See also

 Columbus Day
 Columbus's vow
 Exploration of North America
 Lugares colombinos
 Pre-Columbian trans-oceanic contact
 Knights of Colombus

Notes

References

Sources

Further reading
Landstrom, Bjorn, 1966. Columbus: The story of Don Cristobal Colon Admiral of the Ocean. Macmillan.
Young, Filson, and Windham Thomas Wyndham-Quin Dunraven. Christopher Columbus and the New World of His Discovery. Philadelphia: J.B. Lippincott, 1906. (ed., Different version available)
Young, Alexander Bell Filson, Christopher Columbus and the New World of His Discovery; a Narrative, with a Note on the Navigation of Columbus's First Voyage by the Earl of Dunraven, v. 2. J.B. Lippincott company, 1906 (ed., another version)
Pastor, Ludwig, Frederick Ignatius Antrobus, Ralph Francis Kerr, Ernest Graf, and E. F. Peeler. The History of the Popes from the Close of the Middle Ages. Drawn from the Secret Archives of the Vatican and Other Original Sources. St. Louis: Herder, 1899.
Kayserling, Meyer, and Charles Gross. Christopher Columbus and the Participation of the Jews in the Spanish and Portuguese Discoveries. New York: Longmans, Green, 1894.
Winsor, Justin. Christopher Columbus and How He Received and Imparted the Spirit of Discovery. Boston: Houghton, Mifflin, 1892.
Tarducci, Francesco, and Henry F. Brownson. The Life of Christopher Columbus. Detroit: H.F. Brownson, 1890.
Lester, C. Edwards, and Andrew Foster. The Life and Voyage of Americus Vespucius, with Illustrations Concerning the Navigator and the Discovery of the New World. New Haven: H. Mansfield, 1856.
Lester, C. Edwards, Andrew Foster, and Amerigo Vespucci. The Life and Voyages of Americus Vespucius: With Illustrations Concerning the Navigator, and the Discovery of the New World. New York: Baker & Scribner, 1846.

External links

 
 European Voyages of Exploration: Christopher Columbus
 Teaching about the Voyages of Columbus
 Columbus's Last Voyage on the History Channel

 
1490s in North America
1490s in Spain
1490s in the Caribbean
1490s in the Spanish West Indies
1500s in North America
1500s in Spain
1500s in the Caribbean
1500s in the Spanish West Indies
Colonial Puerto Rico
History of the Colony of Santo Domingo
Expeditions from Spain
Exploration of North America
Exploration of South America
History of South America
History of the Caribbean
Age of Discovery
Spanish exploration in the Age of Discovery
Spanish colonial period of Cuba